The Old Bridge over the Ribnica is the oldest bridge in Podgorica, Montenegro. It spans the Ribnica river, near its confluence with the Morača river. The bridge was built during the period of Roman rule and underwent a major reconstruction in the 18th century AD. The reconstruction was funded by Adži-paša Osmanagić and since then the bridge is also known as Adži-paša's bridge.

References

Tourist attractions in Podgorica
Bridges in Podgorica
Roman bridges
Ottoman architecture in Montenegro
Bridges completed in the 18th century
Rebuilt buildings and structures in Montenegro